Apollo Peak is a dolerite-capped peak rising to  west of Mount Electra in the Olympus Range, Victoria Land. The peak was named after the god Apollo, in association with other names from Greek mythology used in this range, by the New Zealand Antarctic Place-Names Committee in 1984 after work carried out by the New Zealand Antarctic Research Program.

References

Mountains of Victoria Land
Scott Coast
One-thousanders of Antarctica